The following is a list of highest-grossing fantasy films of all time.

Highest-grossing fantasy films
The following is a list of the highest-grossing fantasy films of all time. The top 11 are among the highest-grossing films of all time. Superhero films and science fiction films often have some fantasy elements but are not included here, having their own separate lists.

Biggest worldwide openings on record for fantasy films
This list charts films the biggest worldwide openings. Since films do not open on Fridays in many markets, the 'opening' is taken to be the gross between the first day of release and the first Sunday following the movie's release. Figures prior to the year 2002 are not available. 

Since many American films do not open in all markets at the same time, the 'opening' gross varies depending on when it was released in the US-Canada market. For example, for films like Harry Potter and the Deathly Hallows – Part 2 which opened in the US-Canada market and in most other major markets during the same weekend, the 'opening' is the total gross of the film during that weekend. On the other hand, for films which opened in several markets a week ahead of their respective releases in the US-Canada market, the 'opening' is the sum of the opening grosses in the markets where they were released first and the opening in the US-Canada market. In the latter case, the opening grosses from territories after the initial overseas opening are not included in the 'opening' of the film. In all cases, if a film opens in a market after its release in the US-Canada market, that opening is not included in the 'opening' of the film.

Highest-grossing fantasy films by year

(...) Since grosses are not limited to original theatrical runs, a film's first-run gross is included in brackets after the total if known.

Timeline of highest-grossing fantasy films
The following is a timeline of highest-grossing fantasy films of all time.

Highest-grossing fantasy film series & franchises
The following is a list of the highest-grossing fantasy film series & franchises of all time. The top 6 are along the highest grossing film series and franchises of all time. The Wizarding World has the highest gross with a total gross of $9.6 billion, while Frozen has the highest average with $1.4 billion.

Box office admissions

See also
 Lists of highest-grossing films
 List of highest-grossing films
 Lists of fantasy films

Notes

References 

Fantasy
Lists of fantasy films